The cinnamon-vented piha (Lipaugus lanioides) is a species of bird in the family Cotingidae. It is endemic to southeastern Brazil.

This species is dull brownish-grey overall. It is slightly paler and duller underneath. As its name suggests, it has a wash of cinnamon brown at the vent.

Its natural habitats are subtropical or tropical moist lowland forest and subtropical or tropical moist montane forest. Declines in range and population are likely contributed to continuing habitat loss and degradation, which has caused this species to be classified as Least concern.

References

External links

 
 
 
 
 
 

cinnamon-vented piha
Birds of the Atlantic Forest
Endemic birds of Brazil
cinnamon-vented piha
Taxonomy articles created by Polbot